Tampines station is a commonly used name for Tampines MRT station – a Singapore Mass Rapid Transit (MRT) station. 

Other stations that contain the name "Tampines" are:

Tampines East MRT station, an MRT station on the Downtown line (DTL)
Tampines West MRT station, another MRT station on the DTL.
Tampines North MRT station, a station planned to be on the Cross Island line (CRL).

See also
 Tampines